João Pedro Vilardi Pinto (born 6 January 1998), better known as Pepê, is a Brazilian professional footballer who plays as a midfielder for Campeonato Brasileiro Série A club Grêmio.

Career

Youth
Pepê joined the youth academy of Flamengo at the age of 10.

Flamengo
He made his senior debut with Flamengo in a 2–0 2018 Campeonato Carioca win against Volta Redonda on 17 January 2018, and scored in his debut.

Pepê scored his first Campeonato Brasileiro Série A goal with a 83rd-minute strike in a 2–0 Flamengo win against Palmeiras on 21 January 2021.

Portimonense (loan)
On 14 August 2018, he joined Portimonense on loan for the 2018–19 season. He made his professional debut with Portimonense in a 1–1 Primeira Liga tie with Belenenses on 3 November 2018.

Cuiabá
On 22 April 2021 Flamengo announced Pepê transfer to Cuiabá two months before the end of his contract, in exchange his former club retains 20% of his economic rights. Pepê signed a three-year contract with Cuiabá.

Career statistics

Honours
Flamengo
Copa Libertadores: 2019
Campeonato Brasileiro Série A: 2019, 2020
Supercopa do Brasil: 2020, 2021
Campeonato Carioca: 2020

Personal life
Pepê is a devout Christian, being a member of the Igreja Presbiteriana das Américas congregation in Barra da Tijuca.

References

External links

1998 births
Living people
Footballers from Rio de Janeiro (city)
Brazilian footballers
CR Flamengo footballers
Portimonense S.C. players
Cuiabá Esporte Clube players
Campeonato Brasileiro Série A players
Primeira Liga players
Association football midfielders
Brazilian expatriate footballers
Brazilian expatriate sportspeople in Portugal
Expatriate footballers in Portugal
Brazilian Presbyterians